Volker Türk (born 1965) is an Austrian lawyer and United Nations official. He has been the United Nations High Commissioner for Human Rights since 17 October 2022.

Education 
Born in Linz, Türk received a Master of Laws from the University of Linz and a doctorate in international law from the University of Vienna, Austria. His doctoral dissertation at the University of Vienna was on the office of the United Nations High Commissioner for Refugees and its mandate and was published by Duncker & Humblot, Berlin in 1992.

Career 
In 1991, Türk became a Junior Professional Officer at the UN and had a temporary assignment in Kuwait funded by the Austrian Foreign Ministry. He then held various posts with the United Nations High Commissioner for Refugees (UNHCR) in different regions of the world, including Malaysia, Kosovo, Bosnia-Herzegovina and the Democratic Republic of Congo. He later became the Director of the Division of International Legal Protection at UNHCR headquarters in Geneva. In February 2015, he was appointed Assistant High Commissioner for Protection, making him the highest-ranking Austrian UN official.

On 18 April 2019, Türk was appointed by Secretary-General António Guterres to succeed Fabrizio Hochschild Drummond as Assistant Secretary-General for Strategic Coordination in the Executive Office of the Secretary-General at the UN Secretariat.

From 2021 to 2022, Türk served as Under-Secretary-General for Policy in the Executive Office of the Secretary-General.

UN High Commissioner for Human Rights, 2022–present
On 8 September 2022, following the favourable vote of the General Assembly, Türk was selected to succeed Michelle Bachelet of Chile as United Nations High Commissioner for Human Rights; at the time, the other candidates included Federico Villegas and Adama Dieng.
He assumed office on 17 October 2022.

Personal life
Türk lives in Geneva.

Awards
In May 2016, Türk was awarded the Human Rights Award of the University of Graz.

Publications
 Erika Feller, Volker Türk, Frances Nicholson (eds.): Refugee Protection in International Law. Cambridge University Press, Cambridge 2003, ISBN 0-521-53281-7.

References 

United Nations High Commissioner for Human Rights officials
Austrian diplomats
1965 births
20th-century Austrian lawyers
Living people

de:Volker Türk